Campichthys nanus is a species of marine fish of the family Syngnathidae. It is known from its type specimens that were collected at Pinda, Morrumbala District, Mozambique in the Western Indian Ocean, although there have been unverified reports of its occurrence in the South China Sea as well. Habitats and feeding habits of this species are unknown.

References

Further reading

WoRMS

Endemic fauna of Mozambique
nanus
Marine fish
Fish described in 1977